Scabiosa columbaria, called the small scabious or dwarf pincushion flower, is a widespread species of flowering plant in the genus Scabiosa, native to Europe, Africa, and western Asia, from Sweden to Angola. In the garden it is a short-lived deciduous perennial. In the wild in Europe it prefers to grow in calcareous grasslands.

Subspecies
The following subspecies are currently accepted:

Scabiosa columbaria subsp. banatica (Waldst. & Kit.) Diklic
Scabiosa columbaria subsp. caespitosa Jamzad
Scabiosa columbaria subsp. columbariaScabiosa columbaria subsp. pratensis'' (St.-Lag.) Braun-Blanq.

References

columbaria
Taxa named by Carl Linnaeus
Plants described in 1753